The Polyneurini are a tribe of cicadas found in the Palearctic and Indomalaya.

Genera include:

 Angamiana
 Formotosena
 Graptopsaltria
 Polyneura

References

External links
 A photo of Angamiana floridula

 
Tibiceninae
Hemiptera tribes